Ärtemark/Billingsfors is a Swedish football club located in Bengtsfors . 
Ärtemark/Billingsfors was created from two clubs Ärtemarks IF and Billingsfors IK

External links
Official site at Dalslands FF 

Sport in Västra Götaland County
Football clubs in Västra Götaland County